Pascal Testroet (born 26 September 1990) is a German professional footballer who plays as a forward for  club FC Ingolstadt.

Career
Testroet played over 50 matches in the 3. Liga for Werder Bremen's reserve side. On 8 June 2011, he signed a contract with 3. Liga team Kickers Offenbach.

In August 2018, he joined Erzgebirge Aue from 2. Bundesliga rivals Dynamo Dresden having agreed a three-year deal.

On 1 June 2022, Testroet signed with FC Ingolstadt.

Career statistics

References

External links

 

1990 births
Living people
Association football forwards
German footballers
SV Werder Bremen II players
Kickers Offenbach players
Arminia Bielefeld players
VfL Osnabrück players
Dynamo Dresden players
FC Erzgebirge Aue players
SV Sandhausen players
FC Ingolstadt 04 players
2. Bundesliga players
3. Liga players
People from Bocholt, Germany
Sportspeople from Münster (region)
Footballers from North Rhine-Westphalia